Canaday Power Station is a 119 (MW) natural gas power plant owned and operated by Nebraska Public Power District, located near Lexington, Nebraska. It was constructed in 1958 by Central Nebraska Public Power and Irrigation. It was acquired by NPPD in 1995, who "mothballed" the power plant (i.e. removed it from use, but maintained it so that it could be used as needed).

References

External links 
 

Power stations in Nebraska
Natural gas-fired power stations in Nebraska
1958 establishments in Nebraska
Energy infrastructure completed in 1958
Buildings and structures in Dawson County, Nebraska